Salina Stadium is a sport stadium in Salina, Kansas.  It is located on the campus of Salina High School Central. It is home to both Salina High School Central and Salina High School South's football, soccer, and track and field teams.

The Kansas Wesleyan University Coyotes football, soccer, and track and field programs used the facility as well while their on-campus stadium underwent an extensive renovation, but their use ended officially on October 3, 2015, with the opening of the Graves Family Sports Complex. The stadium is also used for other community events.

External links
 Salina Central Mustangs Football Official website
 Kansas Wesleyan University Athletic Facilities Official website

References

College football venues
Sports venues in Salina, Kansas
American football venues in Kansas
Kansas Wesleyan Coyotes football
Soccer venues in Kansas
High school football venues in the United States